Upper Warlingham railway station is on the Oxted line serving Warlingham and Whyteleafe in Surrey, England. The station is managed by Southern.

Description
Train services are provided by Southern with no special services – the station is on the Oxted Line.  The station is approximately 150m (geographically) from Whyteleafe railway station, to the north-west, which is on a nearby mainly parallel and shorter line from London, the Caterham Line.

On the London-bound platform, there is a staffed ticket office (attended for most of the day). Outside the station is a self-service passenger-operated ticket machine with cash and contactless payments. There is a card only ticket machine located on platform 2.

The station is included in London Zone 6.

The "Upper" prefix originated because what is now  station on the Caterham line, approximately 600 yards to the south west, was previously (until 1956) called Warlingham station and the prefix was originally necessary to differentiate them, Whyteleafe South station being lower down in the valley. Somehow the prefix survived the change in 1956.

Services
Off-peak, all services at Upper Warlingham are operated by Southern using  EMUs.

The typical off-peak service in trains per hour is:
 1 tph to 
 1 tph to  via 

During the peak hours and on weekends, the service is increased to 2 tph in each direction.

These services are operated using  EMUs.

References

External links 

Railway stations in Surrey
Former Croydon and Oxted Joint Railway stations
Railway stations in Great Britain opened in 1884
Railway stations served by Govia Thameslink Railway